Stenodus nelma, known alternatively as the nelma, sheefish, siifish, inconnu or connie, is a commercial species of freshwater whitefish in the family Salmonidae. It is widespread in the Arctic rivers from the Kola Peninsula (White Sea basin) eastward across Siberia to the Anadyr River and also in the North American basins of the Yukon River and Mackenzie River.

Appearance and lifestyle 
The fish has a large mouth with a protruding lower jaw and a high and pointed dorsal fin. It is generally silver in color with a green, blue or brown back. The meat is white, flaky and somewhat oily.

The fish eat plankton for their first year of life and then become predators of smaller fish. They live in lakes and rivers and in the brackish water at the outlets of rivers into the ocean.

Systematics
Stenodus nelma has previously been considered a subspecies of Stenodus leucichthys (S. leucichthys nelma). 
The typical Stenodus leucichthys (beloribitsa) is a landlocked Eurasian species restricted to the Caspian Sea basin, and now extinct in the wild.

References

External links 
 "Mackenzie River Ecosystem: A Dynamic Delta: Inconnu: The "Unknown" Fish" GreatCanadianRivers.com
 Stenodus leucichthys nelma Illustration by N.N. Kondrakov. NOAA Photo Library.

Stenodus
Freshwater fish of the Arctic
Fish of the Arctic Ocean
Fish described in 1773
Fish of Russia
Fish of the United States